Asan Medical Center is a hospital in Seoul, South Korea. It was established to put into practice the founding principles of Asan Foundation founder Chung Ju-yung. It opened on June 23, 1989, under the name Seoul Jungang (Central) Hospital, and was renamed Asan Medical Center on April 27, 2002. With 2,715 licensed beds and a total floor area of approximately 280,000 square meters (85,000 pyeong), it is the largest hospital in Korea.

Since 1993, AMC has been operating the Performance Improvement Team for the betterment of healthcare quality.

In 2011, the hospital implemented a year-round evaluation guideline called Asan Global Standard (AGS), designed around the baseline assessment of Joint Commission International (JCI).

Medical Care
AMC has 49 clinical departments and divisions and 39 specialized centers and departmental specialist clinics, including the Asan Cancer Institute, Diabetes Center, and Organ Transplantation Center. The Asan Heart Institute specializes in treatment of cardiovascular diseases, and Children's Hospital provides care to pediatric patients aged 0 to 18. 

In terms of clinical achievements, AMC has a strong presence in the areas of cancer care and organ transplantation. An analysis of data from the Health Insurance Review & Assessment Service (HIRA) reported in February 2006 by the Dong-a Ilbo newspaper found that AMC had the highest surgical performance for nine of the ten major types of cancer, in relation to cancer incidence rates in Korea. According to the 2006 annual report of the Korea Network for Organ Sharing (KONOS), run by the Ministry of Health and Welfare, AMC performed 581 of Korea's 2,346 organ transplantations in 2005, or 24.9% of the total number for that year. In 2010, AMC was ranked first in performance of liver, heart, and kidney transplants, and notably had the world's highest volume of liver transplants at 381 cases (performed on 367 recipients; 2:1 liver transplants are counted twice by KONOS).

Since 1999, AMC has been equipped with its own internally developed computerized systems, including PACS (picture archiving and communication system) and OCS (order communication system). In 2012, a mobile website was launched to enable smartphone-based services such as making and confirming appointments or retrieving blood test results.

Research and study
In various areas of clinical and basic medicine, AMC published 567 and 825 research papers in 2005 and 2006 respectively to domestic and international medical fields, and provides integrated courses by affiliating with the University of Ulsan College of Medicine. AMC offers medical students with clinical experiences by operating a pre-internship program twice a year as well. As an affiliate medical center of Harvard Medical School, AMC runs a mutual patient advisory and referral system with Harvard Medical School and collaborates in the areas of medical treatment, education, health technology planning through the exchange of doctors, nurses, health technicians, and administrative staff with Harvard Medical School.
Through the partnership contracted with Imperial College London in February 2007, AMC pursues an active clinical exchange and joint research for the areas of clinical and basic medicine.

Awards 
In 2015, for the ninth consecutive year, AMC was ranked Korea's No. 1 ‘Most Admired Hospital' (general hospital category) in a survey conducted by Korea Management Association Consulting (KMAC).
In 2012, AMC was named the No. 1 ‘Most Trusted Hospital' in Korea in the Korean Standard Service Quality Index (KS-SQI).
In 2010, AMC received top overall ranking in the National Customer Satisfaction Index (NCSI) and was ranked No. 1 for three consecutive years in the Global Customer Satisfaction Competency Index (GCSI).
In 2009, AMC received the top prize in the 2009 Most Trusted Brand Awards (organizer: Chosun Ilbo/Digital Chosun Ilbo media enterprise).
In 2008, AMC received the top prize in the 2008 Social Contribution Corporate Awards (organizer: Korean Customers' Forum).

Capacity
Total licensed beds: 2,715 licensed beds (1,161 in East Building, 731 in West Building, 827 in New Building)
Outpatients: Daily average of 11,380
Inpatients: Annual average of 912,259 (daily average of 2,519)
Emergency patients: Annual average of 113,261
Surgical operations: Annual average of 59,947 surgeries

Affiliates

Asan Foundation
The Asan Foundation was established by the late chairman, Chung Ju-Yung, as one of the commemoration works for the 30th The Asan Foundation is a public interest foundation established in July 1977 through private funds donated by Chung Ju-Yung, the late honorary chairman of the Hyundai Group. Its founding commemorated the 30th anniversary of Hyundai Engineering and Construction, the parent company of the Hyundai Group. Towards fulfilling the founder's vision of helping those who are less fortunate, the foundation carries out a range of medical and welfare projects. Since its earliest days, the Asan Foundation has been providing the benefits of medical care, and has established eight general hospitals nationwide, including rural areas which previously had no modern medical facilities. Among the locations are Jeongeup, Boseong, Boryeong, Yeongdeok, Hongcheon, and Gangneung. The Asan Foundation supports pro bono medical care projects to assist Koreans without access to proper care due to economic hardship. Other projects include social welfare support programs to assist various social welfare organizations, including senior care facilities, child welfare centers, and welfare facilities for the disabled; academic research support program to encourage academic research; and a scholarship program to nurture outstanding talent and aid disadvantaged youth. The Foundation presents two awards, the Asan Award for volunteering and sharing culture, and the Asan Award in Medicine for medical scientists devoting themselves to medical development. The name of the foundation comes from the village of Asan-ri in Tongchon County, Gangwon Province, which was the hometown of the late honorary chairman Chung Ju-Yung.

University of Ulsan College of Medicine
Since its founding in 1988, the University of Ulsan College of Medicine has implemented a systematic integrated education system in basic and clinical medicine. Its curriculum is oriented towards problem-solving, with the educational goal of cultivating accomplished clinical practitioners and medical scientists able to contribute to human health and welfare through mastery of basic medical knowledge and skills and acquisition of new medical knowledge. In December 2004, the Seoul campus of the University of Ulsan College of Medicine was relocated to AMC's Asan Education Research Center. Its teaching hospitals include AMC, Ulsan University Hospital, and Gangneung Asan Hospital.

ASAN Institute for Life Sciences
The ASAN Institute for Life Sciences operates through a cooperative system between AMC and the University of Ulsan College of Medicine, and is home to research in the fields of clinical and basic medicine and related disciplines. Among the institute's divisions are the Biomedical Research Center, Clinical Research Center, Clinical Trial Center, Bio-Resource Center, and Human Research Protection Center. The ASAN Institute for Life Sciences is Korea's first privately funded global bio-cluster. In a newly constructed building that opened in 2011, basic, translational, and clinical research is conducted by domestic and foreign research institutes. A collaborative research network of Korean and international researchers work in such areas as development of new drugs, diagnostic techniques, and clinical treatment methods. Its research staff includes approximately 1,300 researchers, including some 540 clinical instructors from AMC and about 760 specialized medical researchers.

Asan Health Network
Gangneung Asan Hospital, Keumkang Asan Hospital, Bosung Asan Hospital, Boryeong Asan Hospital, Youngdeok Asan Hospital, Jeongeup Asan Hospital, Hongcheon Asan Hospital

References

Hospital buildings completed in 1989
Teaching hospitals in South Korea
1989 establishments in South Korea
Hospitals established in 1989
Hospitals in Seoul
20th-century architecture in South Korea